Sultan Al-Sowaidi (Arabic:سلطان السويدي) (born 26 November 1993) is an Emirati footballer. He currently plays as a full back for Emirates on loan from Al Dhafra.

On 13 October 2017 he made his debut for Al Dhafra in a game against his former club and scored a stunning equaliser in the 45th minute.

External links

References

Emirati footballers
1993 births
Living people
Al Jazira Club players
Al Dhafra FC players
Al-Ittihad Kalba SC players
Emirates Club players
UAE Pro League players
Association football fullbacks